Dar Sufeh (also Romanized as Dar Şūfeh and Darsūfeh; also known as Darb Sūfeh and Kalāteh-ye Mollā) is a village in Zibad Rural District, Kakhk District, Gonabad County, Razavi Khorasan Province, Iran. At the 2006 census, its population was 16, in 6 families.

References

Gallery 

Populated places in Gonabad County